Neocrepidodera simplicipes is a species of flea beetle in the leaf beetle family that is endemic to Austria.

References

Beetles described in 1860
Beetles of Europe
simplicipes
Endemic fauna of Austria